Kitob is a city in Kitob District of Qashqadaryo Region in Uzbekistan. It is the administrative center of Kitob District. Its population is 40,800 (2016).

During the Soviet period, a major astronomical observatory was built at Kitab to commemorate its medieval reputation as the 'town of astronomers.'

References

Populated places in Qashqadaryo Region
Cities in Uzbekistan